USS Nevada may refer to:

 , built in 1865 but never commissioned, renamed Nevada in August 1869
  a monitor commissioned in 1902, renamed Tonopah in 1909, and sold in 1922
  a battleship, commissioned in 1916, served during World War II, and finally sunk for practice in 1948
  an Ohio-class ballistic missile submarine commissioned in 1986 and currently in active service

United States Navy ship names